The following highways are numbered 391:

Canada
Manitoba Provincial Road 391
Newfoundland and Labrador Route 391
 Quebec Route 391

Japan
 Japan National Route 391

United States
  Interstate 391
  Colorado State Highway 391
  Florida State Road 391
  New York State Route 391
  Puerto Rico Highway 391
  South Carolina Highway 391
  South Dakota Highway 391
  Tennessee State Route 391
  Virginia State Route 391
  Wyoming Highway 391